Evanilson may refer to:

Evanílson (footballer, born 1975), Brazilian footballer 
Evanilson (footballer, born 1999), Brazilian footballer